State Route 95, also known as SR 95, is a north–south state highway along the western edge of Arizona that is split into two sections.

Route description

The southern segment begins in Quartzsite at its junction with U.S. Route 95, traveling north to Parker then following the Colorado River until past Lake Havasu City, and finally intersecting Interstate 40.  The northern segment (the Mohave Valley Highway) begins at the Colorado River bridge across from Needles, then goes directly northbound to Bullhead City, terminating at its junction with State Route 68 north of town.

There is a short SR 95 Truck at Parker, formerly a section of Arizona State Route 72, connecting to California State Highway 62.  Another spur, SR 95S, exists at Parker Dam, and is signed as a spur from the mainline but is unmarked along the spur itself. In Lake Havasu City, SR 95 also provides access to London Bridge.

As the primary north–south highway through much of the Arizona side of the Colorado River, SR 95 is an important thoroughfare for residents in the cities and towns of that area.

History
State Route 95 (SR 95) was first designated on May 26, 1936 over a former county road between San Luis and Yuma. On June 20, 1938, SR 95 was extended north through Quartzsite to SR 72 in Bouse. The road south of Quartzsite to San Luis was renumbered as part of U.S. Route 95 on June 27, 1960. The road to Bouse was turned over to Yuma County to maintain in 1953-1955. Parts of SR 95 around the town of Parker were part of SR 72 until 1962. SR 95 also replaced SR 172 north of Parker. The part of SR 72 northwest of Parker became a spur of SR 95.

Junction list

Truck route

Parker truck route

State Route 95 Alternate (SA 95), also known as SR 95 Truck, is a short spur of SR 95 in Parker. Locally, it is also known as California Avenue. Commercial vehicles travelling from either end of the highway must stop at inspection stations situated at the Parker Port of Entry between 3rd Street and 4th Street, provided such facilities are open.

Major intersections

Spur routes

Parker Dam spur

State Route 95 Spur (SR 95S or SS 95(2)), is a short spur of SR 95 located in unincorporated La Paz County. Locally, it is also known as Parker Dam Road. Route ends at the Parker Dam which stretches into Parker Dam, California.

Major intersections

Cattail Cove State Park spur

State Route 95 Spur (SR 95S or SS 95(3)), is a short spur of SR 95 located in unincorporated Mohave County. Locally, it is also known as Cattail Cove Road. Route is the entry and exit road into Cattail Cove State Park, located a few miles southeast of Lake Havasu City, Arizona.

References

External links

SR 95 at Arizona Roads

095
Arizona State Route 095
Transportation in La Paz County, Arizona
Transportation in Mohave County, Arizona
U.S. Route 95